Coelogyne calcicola is a species of orchid.

calcicola
Plants described in 1933